The 1997–98 B Group was the forty-second season of the Bulgarian B Football Group, the second tier of the Bulgarian football league system. A total of 16 teams contested the league.

Septemvri Sofia, Pirin Blagoevgrad and Shumen were promoted to Bulgarian A Group. Montana, Port-Avtotreid Varna, Storgosia Pleven and Dunav-Rakovski Ruse were relegated.

League table

References

1997-98
Bul
2